Count Gerald Edward O'Kelly de Gallagh et Tycooly (1890–1968) was an Irish diplomat and the third of the seven sons of Count John Appleyard O'Kelly.

Early life, education and family
He was born in Gurtragh in North Tipperary. His mother Mary 'Byrne, was daughter of Count John O'Byrne of Corville and granddaughter of Baron von Hubner, Austrian ambassador in Paris 1849–58; she was born in Toulouse, France with Wild Geese ancestry. 
Thanks to his mother he spoke and wrote fluent French. He was educated at Clongowes Wood College, Co Kildare, and the then Royal University of Ireland.

Career
After travelling extensively in the Far East and America, he saw active service in the first world war from 1915, and was wounded in action. He spent time in business in Yokohama, Japan and in other Asian cities.  
He was the new Irish Free State government of Ireland's agent in Switzerland then in Belgium, then envoy extraordinary and minister plenipotentiary to France. He was the main force behind the diplomatic push to get Ireland a temporary seat in the League of Nations, using his extensive friendships with international diplomats. Replaced as ambassador, he was the sole Irish diplomat to remain in Paris throughout the second world war, and negotiated successfully with the German occupiers to save many imprisoned Irish people, as well as giving Irish passports to needy British applicants. Through selling wines from his company Vendome Wines, he siphoned information from the occupying Nazis and passed it to the British.

In 1948 he was appointed chargé d'affaires in Lisbon, Portugal, with the personal rank of minister; when he again retired in August 1955 he remained honorary counsellor to the Lisbon Irish legation. In 1962 he was again invited by the government of the Republic of Ireland to take up the post of chargé d'affaires at Lisbon, and so remained until his death
He was involved the wine export trade, and was the French translator of Omar Khayyám.

Honours
He was a count of the Holy Roman Empire, Knight of the Sovereign Order of Malta, Grand Officer of the Légion d'honneur, and a Grand Officer of the Order of Christ. In this private role he used his contacts to secure safety of Irish trapped in France in the years of occupation.

Personal life and death
He married Amy Marjorie Stuart; they had no children. He died in Lisbon in 1968.

Positions held 
From 1919 to 1921 he was Sinn Féin envoy to Bern. 
From 1921 to 1929 he was Irish representative to Brussels, Belgium.
From 1929 to 1935 he was the first Minister Plenipotentiary to Paris.
From 1935 to 1948 he was Special Counsellor at Paris and Brussels Legations
From 1948 to 1968 he was Chargé d'affaires at Lisbon.

References

External links
 

1890 births
1968 deaths
Ambassadors of Ireland to France
Ambassadors of Ireland to Belgium